Ian Buruma (born December 28, 1951) is a Dutch writer and editor who lives and works in the United States. In 2017, he became editor of The New York Review of Books, but left the position in September 2018.

Much of his writing has focused on the culture of Asia, particularly that of China and 20th-century Japan. He was the Paul W. Williams Professor of Human Rights and Journalism at Bard College from 2003 to 2017.

Early life and education
Buruma was born and raised in The Hague, Netherlands. His father, Sytze Leonard "Leo" Buruma, was a Dutch lawyer and the son of a Mennonite minister, and his mother, Gwendolyn Margaret "Wendy" Schlesinger, a Briton of German-Jewish descent. He went to study at Leiden University in 1971, and obtained a Candidate degree in Chinese literature and History in 1975. He subsequently pursued postgraduate studies in Japanese cinema from 1975 to 1977 at the College of Art (Nichidai Geijutsu Gakko) of the Nihon University (Tokyo, Japan).

Career

Overview
Buruma lived in Japan from 1975 to 1981, where he worked as a film reviewer, photographer and documentary filmmaker. During the 1980s, he edited the cultural section of the Far Eastern Economic Review in Hong Kong. He later traveled throughout Asia working as a freelance writer. Buruma is a board member of Human Rights in China and a fellow of the European Council of Foreign Relations. Buruma has contributed numerous articles to The New York Review of Books since 1985 and has written for The Guardian. He held fellowships at the Wissenschaftskolleg in Berlin (1991) and the Woodrow Wilson International Center for Scholars in Washington, D.C. (1999), and he was an Alistair Horne fellow of St Antony's College in Oxford, UK. In 2000, he delivered the Huizinga Lecture (on "Neoromanticism of writers in exile") in the Pieterskerk in Leiden, Netherlands.

From 2003 to 2017, Buruma was Luce Professor of Democracy, Human Rights and Journalism at Bard College, New York. In 2017, he became editor of The New York Review of Books, succeeding founding editor Robert B. Silvers.

New York Review of Books controversy
In September 2018, Buruma left the NYRB position in the wake of a dispute about his decision to publish an essay by the Canadian talk show host Jian Ghomeshi. Ghomeshi was acquitted in 2016 of one count of choking and four counts of sexual assault, after over 20 women complained either to the police or in the media. The publication of the essay was controversial, in part, because Ghomeshi wrote that the allegations against him were "inaccurate". In an interview with Slate magazine, Buruma defended his decision to publish, and denied that the article was misleading because it had failed to mention that Ghomeshi had been required to issue an apology to one of the victims as part of the terms of a case against him. He also denied that the title, "Reflections from a Hashtag", was dismissive of the #MeToo movement; stated that the movement has resulted in "undesirable consequences"; and said: "I’m no judge of the rights and wrongs of every allegation. ... The exact nature of [Ghomeshi's] behavior – how much consent was involved – I have no idea, nor is it really my concern."

There was significant "outrage" over his defense of the article. The Review later stated that it had departed from its "usual editorial practices", as the essay "was shown to only one male editor during the editing process", and that Buruma's statement to Slate about the staff of the Review "did not accurately represent their views". More than 100 contributors to the Review, a group of acclaimed authors that included Joyce Carol Oates and Ian McEwan, signed a letter of protest to express fears that Buruma's exit threatened intellectual culture and "the free exploration of ideas".

Awards
In 2004, Buruma was awarded an Honorary Doctorate (Dr.h.c.) in Theology from the University of Groningen.

In 2008, Buruma was awarded the Erasmus Prize, which is awarded to an individual who has made "an especially important contribution to culture, society or social science in Europe". He is among the 100 top global thinkers of 2010, as selected by the Foreign Policy magazine. Foreign Policy explained his contribution as a public intellectual:

In April 2012, he was awarded the Abraham Kuyper Prize for Excellence in Reformed Theology and Public Life at the Princeton Theological Seminary. Buruma has won several prizes for his books, including the Los Angeles Times Book Prize and the PEN/Diamonstein-Spielvogel Award for the Art of the Essay for Theater of Cruelty. He has held a number of editorial and academic positions and has been termed a "well-regarded European intellectual". He argued in 2001 for wholehearted British participation in the European Union because they were the "strongest champions in Europe of a liberal approach to commerce and politics". He has been a regular contributor to Project Syndicate since 2001.

Personal life
Buruma has been married twice. He and his first wife, Sumie Tani, had a daughter, as did he and his second wife, Hotta Eri. Buruma is a nephew of the English film director John Schlesinger, with whom he published a series of interviews in book form.

Bibliography 

 
 
 
 Tokyo: Form and Spirit (1986) with James Brandon, Kenneth Frampton, Martin Friedman, Donald Richie  
 God's Dust: A Modern Asian Journey (1989) 
 Great Cities of the World: Hong Kong (1991)
 Playing the Game (1991) novel 
 The Wages of Guilt: Memories of War in Germany and in Japan (1994) 
 Introduction for Geisha: The Life, the Voices, the Art (1998) by Jodi Cobb 
 Voltaire's Coconuts, or Anglomania in Europe (UK title) (1998) or Anglomania: a European Love Affair (US title) (1999) 
 The Pilgrimage from Tiananmen Square, The New York Times (1999)
 The Missionary and the Libertine: Love and War in East and West (2000) compilation 
 De neo-romantiek van schrijvers in exil ("Neoromanticism of writers in exile") (2000) 
 Bad Elements: Chinese Rebels from Los Angeles to Beijing (2001) 
 Inventing Japan: From Empire to Economic Miracle 1853–1964 (2003) 
 Occidentalism: The West in the Eyes of Its Enemies (2004) with Avishai Margalit 
 Murder in Amsterdam: The Death of Theo Van Gogh and the Limits of Tolerance (2006)  winner of The Los Angeles Times Book Prize for the Best Current Interest Book.
 Conversations with John Schlesinger (2006) 
 Commentary on the History of China for the time period of The Last Emperor, The Criterion Collection 2008 DVDs (ASIN: B000ZM1MIW).
 The China Lover (2008) novel 
 China's class ceiling, published in the Los Angeles Times
 Taming the Gods: Religion and Democracy on Three Continents (2010) , with some historical examples of the value the separation of religion and national governance with the separation of church and state as one example.
 Grenzen aan de vrijheid: van De Sade tot Wilders (Limits to Freedom: From De Sade to Wilders) (2010)  – Essay for the Month of Philosophy in the Netherlands.
 
 "The Man Who Got It Right", The New York Review of Books (2013)
 Theater of Cruelty: Art, Film, and the Shadows of War (2014) 
 
 Their Promised Land: My Grandparents in Love and War (2016)
 
 
 
 The Collaborators: Three Stories of Deception and Survival in World War II, Penguin Random House, 2023.

Notes

References

External links

 Official Website, with curriculum vitae
 Column archive at Project Syndicate
 Column archive at The Guardian
 Column archive at The New York Review of Books
 
 
 
 
 Article archive at Journalisted

Interviews
 Voices on Antisemitism Interview with Ian Buruma  from the United States Holocaust Memorial Museum
 Ian Buruma discusses A Murder in Amsterdam FORA.tv

1951 births
Living people
20th-century Dutch novelists
20th-century essayists
20th-century male writers
21st-century Dutch novelists
21st-century essayists
21st-century Dutch male writers
Bard College faculty
Dutch academics
Dutch columnists
Dutch essayists
Dutch expatriates in Japan
Dutch expatriates in the United States
20th-century Dutch historians
Dutch journalists
Dutch male novelists
Dutch people of British descent
Dutch people of German-Jewish descent
Fellows of St Antony's College, Oxford
Historians of China
Historians of Japan
Leiden University alumni
Male essayists
Nihon University alumni
The New York Review of Books people
The New Yorker people
Writers from The Hague
21st-century Dutch historians